Sumiko Takahara (June 16, 1933 Tokyo, died August 19, 2001) was an economist, Japanese Ambassador (to Finland, 1995-1998), chief of the now-defunct Economic Planning Agency, and the first female president of Japanese baseball’s Central League (March 1998 - December 2000).

Biography
Takahara worked as a reporter for Mainichi Shimbun (1955-1963) after graduating from Hitotsubashi University. Takahara was the Economic Planning Agrncy (EPA) chief under Prime Minister Toshiki Kaifu between August 1989 and February 1990, becoming the sixth woman and the first female nonpolitician in history to join the Cabinet.  She stepped down from her position with the Central League when she needed to be hospitalized for mycosis fungoides.  Her death was attributed to malignant lymphoma.

See also
 Women in baseball

References

Hitotsubashi University alumni
Ambassadors of Japan to Finland
Women government ministers of Japan
Women baseball executives
Japanese women journalists
Japanese women economists